Irma Cordero (8 March 1942 – 16 November 2019) was a Peruvian volleyball player. She competed at the 1968 Summer Olympics and the 1976 Summer Olympics.

References

External links
 

1942 births
2019 deaths
Peruvian women's volleyball players
Olympic volleyball players of Peru
Volleyball players at the 1968 Summer Olympics
Volleyball players at the 1976 Summer Olympics
People from Piura
Pan American Games medalists in volleyball
Pan American Games silver medalists for Peru
Medalists at the 1967 Pan American Games
Medalists at the 1971 Pan American Games
Medalists at the 1975 Pan American Games
20th-century Peruvian women